C/1917 F1 (Mellish), also known as Comet 1917Ι and 1917a, is a Halley-type comet discovered by John E. Mellish on 19 March 1917. The comet has an orbital period of 143 years and last passed perihelion on 11 April 1917. It is the parent body of the December Monocerotids and has also been suggested to be the parent body of April ρ-Cygnids, November Orionids, and Canis-Minorids meteor showers.

The comet upon discovery was in the constellation of Aries and it was located low in the sky and was very condensed. On 23 March a short tail was reported. After perihelion, on 11 April, the comet nucleus was reported to be very bright on 14 April, with a report mentioning it was brighter than Venus, while it developed a tail that measured 10 degrees in length. The comet faded quickly and by the end of April it was of 5th magnitude and the comet's tail was three degrees long.

The comet has an orbital period of about 145 years, and thus fits the definition of Halley type comets, which have an orbital period between 20 and 200 years. Its orbital period is similar to comet Swift-Tuttle, the parent body of the Perseids.

References

External links 
 

Halley-type comets
19170319
Meteor shower progenitors